Mito District is one of fifteen districts of the province of Concepción in Peru.

References